William Lewis Donckers (January 8, 1951 – December 3, 2012) was an American football quarterback in the National Football League who played for the St. Louis Cardinals. He played college football for the San Diego State Aztecs. He also played in the World Football League for The Hawaiians.

He died in 2012.

References

1951 births
2012 deaths
American football quarterbacks
St. Louis Cardinals (football) players
The Hawaiians players
San Diego State Aztecs football players